The Sapphire Aircraft Australia Sapphire LSA is an Australian ultralight aircraft that was designed and produced by Sapphire Aircraft Australia. It was introduced in the late 1980s and still in production as recently as 2010, but now out of production. The Sapphire was supplied as complete ready-to-fly-aircraft.

Design and development
The Sapphire complies with the Fédération Aéronautique Internationale microlight rules. It features a strut-braced high-wing, a single-seat enclosed  cockpit with a bubble canopy or, optionally, an open cockpit with a windshield, fixed conventional landing gear and a single engine in pusher configuration.

The aircraft is made from fibreglass, epoxy resin and extruded foam. The standard engine fitted is the  Rotax 503 two-stroke powerplant.

In the early 2010s period a two-seat version and a motorglider variant were being developed.

Specifications (Sapphire LSA)

References

External links
Former location of company website
Photo of the Sapphire LSA on Airliners.net
Official company video

1980s Australian ultralight aircraft
Single-engined pusher aircraft